Jose Antonio Menendez (born March 11, 1969) is a member of the Texas Senate for District 26. A member of the Democratic Party, he is a former member of the Texas House of Representatives for District 124. He won a special election on February 17, 2015, for the state Senate, to replace Leticia Van de Putte. She resigned to run, unsuccessfully as it developed, against the short-term incumbent, Ivy Taylor, for mayor of San Antonio, Texas.  Menendez handily defeated fellow Democratic State Representative Trey Martinez Fischer for the right to succeed Van de Putte. Even though Menendez and Fischer remain political opponents, their relationship appears to have been civil.

Menendez served in the Texas House from 2001 to 2015. Prior to his service in the State House, he was a member of the San Antonio City Council for District 6.

Background 
Jose Menendez was born in San Juan in Hidalgo County in South Texas. He graduated in 1987 from Central Catholic Marianist High School. Four years later, he graduated from Southern Methodist University in University Park, Texas, where he received his Bachelor of Business Administration and a Bachelor of Arts in Latin American Studies. He returned to San Antonio, where he took over his family business in 1991.

Menendez and his wife, Cehlia Newman-Menendez, have three children: Dominic Newman-Menendez, Victoria Newman-Menendez, and Austin Newman-Menendez. Menendez and his family reside in San Antonio and Austin, Texas.

Political career 
Menendez was appointed to the San Antonio Zoning Commission for District 6 in 1994. In 1997, after a heated campaign, he was elected to the District 6 seat on the city council.

In 1999, Menendez was re-elected to the council with more than 84 percent of the vote. He served on the Small Business, International, and Ethics committees. He also was the chairman of the City's Community Revitalization Action Group (CRAG). In 2000, term-limited on the council, he ran for the state House of Representatives and was sworn into his first term in 2001. As a representative, Menendez headed the House Committee on Defense and Veterans' Affairs, which put him in contact with thousands of Texas veterans and provided a basis for his successful run thereafter for the Texas Senate.

Menendez won election to a full term in the state Senate in the Democratic primary on March 1, 2016, when he defeated his former opponent, Trey Martinez Fischer, who, this time gave up the District 116 House seat, Fischer held, to run for the Senate. A number of lobbyists and political action committees which had supported Martinez Fischer switched allegiance to the incumbent Menendez, whose campaign chairman, Colin Strother, worked in numerous successful campaigns; among them U.S. Representative Henry Cuellar of Laredo in Texas's 28th congressional district. Menendez faced no Republican opposition in his heavily Democratic district.

In a debate before the American Association of Retired Persons in San Antonio, Menendez noted that Martinez Fischer would have become dean of the Bexar County state House delegation had he remained in the House. Martinez Fischer did assume the Bexar County legislative dean's position on February 1, 2016, with the retirement of colleague Ruth McClendon. "Trey did a great job in the House killing many, many bills... We have differences of opinion, we debate. We're passionate about it, but we're also respectful about it," said Menendez.

Buoyed by the power of incumbency for just a year, Menendez defeated Martinez Fischer, 31,046 votes (59.2 percent) to 21,383 (40.8 percent).

On the last day of the regular legislative session in 2017, Menendez used a filibuster to kill a bill supported by Republican Donna Campbell of New Braunfels, which would have made it more difficult for municipalities to annex surrounding territory.

In the 2017 special legislative session, Menendez spoke against a bill to increase the penalty from misdemeanor to felony when one is convicted of intentionally submitting false information on a mail-in ballot application. Menendez argued that such legislation would lead to "unintended consequences." Kelly Hancock, a Republican senator from North Richland Hills in Tarrant County, argued that the legislation is needed because mail-in voting has been linked to illegal voting and election fraud.

References

External links 
 Profile at the Texas Senate
 Jose Menendez for Texas Senate
 Express News article
 Bexar County election order
 Chron.com Texas legislature
 Yellowbot.com info
 Bexar County elected officials guide
 Sabor San Antonio
 Texas State Directory
 Capitol Annex.com

 Archived Texas Senate Profile

1969 births
Living people
Democratic Party Texas state senators
Democratic Party members of the Texas House of Representatives
Hispanic and Latino American state legislators in Texas
People from San Antonio
People from Hidalgo County, Texas
Central Catholic Marianist High School alumni
Southern Methodist University alumni
San Antonio City Council members
Businesspeople from Texas
21st-century American politicians